Masses, Passions, Oratorios is the subject of the second series of the Neue Bach-Ausgabe (NBA, New Bach Edition), a publication of Johann Sebastian Bach's music from 1954 to 2007. In the Bach-Werke-Verzeichnis (BWV, catalogue of Bach's compositions) masses, passions and oratorios refers to two chapters:
 Chapter 3: Messen, Messensätze, Magnificat (Masses, Mass movements, Magnificat), original range: BWV 232–243
 Chapter 4: Passionen, Oratorien (Passions, Oratorios), original range: BWV 244–249
In the BWV, as in Series II of the NBA, the group thus also includes Bach's Magnificat and separate mass movements.

Further the second series of the NBA and/or the 1998 updated edition of the BWV (BWV2a) group some new additions to the BWV catalogue with the masses, passions and oratorios (e.g. Tilge, Höchster, meine Sünden, BWV 1083, Bach's adaptation of Pergolesi's Stabat Mater), and regroup some compositions that were formerly associated with other genres in the masses, passions and oratorios group (e.g. BWV 11, published as a cantata in the 19th century, added to the group as an oratorio).

Also various items in the BWV Anhang (BWV Anh., annex to the BWV), or even unmentioned in the BWV (BWV deest, lacking a BWV number) are associated with this group, for instance the motet Der Gerechte kömmt um, BC
C 8, arranged, probably by Bach, from the Tristis est anima mea motet attributed to Johann Kuhnau. Such compositions or movements usually have a Bach Digital Work (BDW) page at the  website.

Masses, mass movements and Magnificat

Mass with all usual sections
 BWV 232 – Mass in B minor

Kyrie–Gloria masses
BWV 232I, early version – Missa in B minor for the Dresden court (1733), re-used as part I of the Mass in B minor
 BWV 233 – Missa in F major
 BWV 234 – Missa in A major
 BWV 235 – Missa in G minor
 BWV 236 – Missa in G major

Cantata based on BWV 232I
 BWV 191 – Cantata Gloria in excelsis Deo

Separate mass movements
 BWV 232II, early version – Credo in G major (1748–49?)
 BWV 232III, early version – Sanctus for six vocal parts (1724)
 BWV 233a –  (early version of Kyrie from BWV 233)
 BWV 237 – Sanctus in C major
 BWV 238 – Sanctus in D major
 BWV 239 – Sanctus in D minor (based on the first section of the Gloria of Antonio Caldara's Missa Providentiae)
 BWV 240 – Sanctus in G major (spurious, unknown composer)
 BWV 241 – Sanctus in D major (arrangement of Sanctus from Johann Caspar Kerll's Missa superba)
 BWV 242 – Christe eleison in G minor (composed by Bach for a mass by Francesco Durante, BWW Anh. 26)

Latin Magnificat
 BWV 243 – Magnificat in D major
 BWV 243a – Magnificat in E-flat major, early version of BWV 243, containing four Latin and German interpolations related to Christmas

German Magnificat cantatas
 BWV 10 – Meine Seel erhebt den Herren (German Magnificat)
 BWV 189 – Meine Seele rühmt und preist on a German paraphrase of the Magnificat text, attributed to Melchior Hoffmann.
 BWV Anh. 21 – Meine Seel erhebt den Herren, a.k.a. Kleine Magnificat (small Magnificat), Magnificat in A minor, by Melchior Hoffmann.

Other
 BWV 1081 – Credo intonation in F major for a Mass by Giovanni Battista Bassani, BDW 
 BWV 1082 – Bach's copy of the Suscepit Israel of Antonio Caldara's Magnificat in C major.
 BWV 1083 – Tilge, Höchster, meine Sünden, Bach's adaptation of Pergolesi's Stabat Mater.
 BWV Anh. 24 – Kyrie and Gloria in A minor from "Missa Sancti Lamberti" by Johann Christoph Pez; Bach copied its Kyrie in Weimar, adding a line different from the original continuo; Its Gloria was copied without modification in Leipzig.
 BWV Anh. 25 – Kyrie–Gloria Mass in C major (sometimes attributed to Johann Ludwig Bach, copied & performed by J. S. Bach 1740-1742).
 BWV Anh. 26 –  (by Francesco Durante; see above Christe eleison in G minor, BWV 242)
 BWV Anh. 27 – Sanctus in F major by Johann Ludwig Krebs.
 BWV Anh. 28 – Sanctus in B major (composer unknown).
 BWV Anh. 29 – continuo part for a Mass in C minor
 BWV Anh. 30 – Magnificat in C major for SSAATTBB choir and orchestra attributed to Antonio Lotti, and later to Pietro Torri (copied by Bach around 1742)
 BWV Anh. 166 – Missa super cantilena "Allein Gott in der Höh sei Ehr": Kyrie–Gloria Mass in E minor composed in 1716 by Johann Ludwig Bach, previously attributed to Johann Nicolaus Bach, with part scores written out by J. S. Bach and others for performance in 1729, and a small addition (5 bars) by J. S. Bach at the beginning of the Gloria. The text of the Gloria is partly in German: it intersperses the Latin text of the Gloria with, as cantus firmus, all four stanzas of "Allein Gott in der Höh sei Ehr" (which is itself a paraphrase of the Gloria), a Lutheran hymn by Nicolaus Decius and Joachim Slüter.
 BWV Anh. 167 – Kyrie–Gloria Mass in G major for double SATB choir and orchestra, possibly by Johann Ludwig Bach or Antonio Lotti. One of its 18th-century manuscript copies is partially in J. S. Bach's handwriting. Published and performed as J. S. Bach's in 1805.
 BWV Anh. 168 – Kyrie (and German Gloria) composed by Wilhelm Friedemann Bach, BDW 
 BWV deest – Bach's transposition from D minor to E minor and colla parte orchestration for the first two movements of Palestrina's Missa Sine nomine a 6, to be performed in Leipzig in the early 1740s as a Kyrie–Gloria Mass for SSATTB choir, and an orchestra consisting of cornets, trombones and continuo.

Passions and oratorios

Passions composed by Bach
 BWV 244 – St Matthew Passion (Matthäus-Passion)
 BWV 244b – St Matthew Passion, early version(s)
 BWV 245 – St John Passion (Johannes-Passion), various versions, including:
 St. John Passion, 2nd version, with opening chorus "O Mensch, bewein dein Sünde groß" (1725), BDW , containing:
 BWV 245a – Aria "Himmel reiße, Welt erbebe"
 BWV 245b – Aria "Zerschmettert mich, ihr Felsen und ihr Hügel"
 BWV 245c – Aria "Ach, windet euch nicht so, geplagte Seelen"
 St. John Passion, Bach's last revision (1749), BDW 
 BWV 247 – St Mark Passion (Markus-Passion) (libretto is extant; although the music is lost much of it is reconstructable based on associated compositions)
 BWV deest – Weimarer Passion (lost, music partially recuperated in other compositions), BDW

Passions by other composers with movements by Bach
 BWV 246 – St Luke Passion (Lukas-Passion) by an unknown composer and librettist, includes one movement by Bach:
 BWV 246/40a – Chorale "Aus der Tiefen rufe ich", BDW 
 BWV deest – St Mark Passion (attributed to Keiser), surviving in various (pasticcio) versions, with three movements associated with Bach:
 BWV 500a – Chorale "So gehst du nun, mein Jesu, hin", BDW 
 BWV 1084 – Chorale "O hilf Christe, Gottes Sohn", BDW , and earlier version BDW 
 BWV deest – Chorale "O Traurigkeit, o Herzeleid", BDW , and earlier version BDW 
 BWV deest – Passion oratorio Wer ist der, so von Edom kömmt (pasticcio), with three movements associated with Bach:
 BWV 127/1 (variant) – Chorus "Herr Jesu Christ, wahr' Mensch und Gott", BDW 
 BWV 1088 – Arioso "So heb ich denn mein Auge sehnlich auf", BDW 
 BWV deest – Chorus "Der Gerechte kömmt um", also as separate motet (BC C 8), BDW

Other vocal compositions associated with Passion music
 BWV 244a – Trauermusik Klagt, Kinder, klagt es aller Welt (funeral cantata), music lost but largely reconstructable based on BWV 244b and 198
 BWV 200 – Aria "Bekennen will ich seinen Namen", arranged by Bach from a Passion oratorio by Gottfried Heinrich Stölzel, BDW

Spurious
 BWV Anh. 169 – Passion text Erbauliche Gedanken auf den Grünen Donnerstag und Charfreitag über den Leidenden Jesum by Picander, not set by Bach (apart from some movements of the St Matthew Passion)

Oratorios and associated cantatas
 BWV 248 – Christmas Oratorio (Weihnachts-Oratorium), consisting of six cantatas composed for the Christmas season of 1734–1735:
 BWV 248I – Cantata Jauchzet, frohlocket! Auf, preiset die Tage
 BWV 248II – Cantata Und es waren Hirten in derselben Gegend
 BWV 248III – Cantata Herrscher des Himmels, erhöre das Lallen
 BWV 248IV – Cantata Fallt mit Danken, fallt mit Loben
 BWV 248V – Cantata Ehre sei dir, Gott, gesungen
 BWV 248VI – Cantata Herr, wenn die stolzen Feinde schnauben
 BWV 248VIa – textless cantata, model for BWV 248VI.
 BWV 249 – Easter Oratorio (Oster-Oratorium), also known by its incipit Kommt, eilet und laufet
 BWV 249a – Secular cantata Entfliehet, verschwindet, entweichet, ihr Sorgen
 BWV 249b – Secular cantata Verjaget, zerstreuet, zerrüttet, ihr Sterne
 BWV 11 – Ascension Oratorio (Himmelfahrts-Oratorium), previously known as Cantata Lobet Gott in seinen Reichen

Compositions in the third and fourth chapters of the Bach-Werke-Verzeichnis (1998)

|- id="BWV Chapter 3" style="background: #D8D8D8;"
| data-sort-value="0231.z99" | 3.
| data-sort-value="234.001" colspan="8" | Masses, Mass movements, Magnificat (see also: List of Masses, Mass movements and Magnificats by Johann Sebastian Bach)
| data-sort-value="0288a" | Up ↑
|- style="background: #E3F6CE;"
| data-sort-value="0232.000" | 232
| data-sort-value="234.002" | 3.
| data-sort-value="1749-03-15" | Aug. 1748 – Oct. 1749 (compilation, completion)
| Mass a.k.a. Hohe Messe, Mass in B minor
| B min.
| data-sort-value="ssatbSSAATB Trx3 Tmp Hn Flx2 Obx3 Obax2 Basx2 Vl Str Bc" | ssatbSSAATB 3Tr Tmp Hn 2Fl 3Ob 2Oba 2Bas Vl Str Bc
| data-sort-value="000.06: 000" | 6
| data-sort-value="II/01: 000" | II/1rev 1
| data-sort-value="after BWV 0232/I e.v." | after BWV 232I e. v., II e. v., III e. v., 171/1, 12/2, 120/2, Anh. 11/1,  Anh. 196/3; text after Ordinarium Missae
| 
|- style="background: #E3F6CE;"
| data-sort-value="0232.100" | 232I e. v.
| data-sort-value="234.003" | 3.
| 1733-07-27
| Kyrie–Gloria Mass for the Dresden court (Mass in B Minor, Part I: Missa; early version)
| B min.
| data-sort-value="ssatbSSATB Trx3 Tmp Hn Flx2 Obax2 Basx2 Vl Str Bc" | ssatbSSATB 3Tr Tmp Hn 2Fl 2Oba 2Bas Vl Str Bc
| 
| data-sort-value="II/01: 103" | II/1a
| data-sort-value="after BWV 0029/1" | after BWV 29/1, 46/1; text from Ordinarium Missae; → BWV 191, 232I 
| 
|- style="background: #F5F6CE;"
| data-sort-value="0233.000" | 233
| data-sort-value="238.001" | 3.
| data-sort-value="1738-12-31" | 1738–1739?
| Kyrie–Gloria Mass
| F maj.
| data-sort-value="sabSATB Hnx2 Obx2 Bas Str Bc" | sabSATB 2Hn 2Ob Bas Str Bc
| data-sort-value="000.08: 001" | 8: 1
| data-sort-value="II/02: 197" | II/2: 197
| data-sort-value="after BWV 0233a" | after BWV 233a, 102/3, /5, 40/1; text from Ordinarium Missae
| 
|-
| data-sort-value="0233.100" | 233a
| data-sort-value="239.002" | 3.
| data-sort-value="1708-04-06" | 1708-04-06?
| Kyrie "Christe, du Lamm Gottes"
| F maj.
| SSATB Bc
| data-sort-value="000.41: 187" | 41: 187
| data-sort-value="II/02: 285" | II/2: 285
| text after Ordinarium Missae; → BWV 233/1
| 
|- style="background: #E3F6CE;"
| data-sort-value="0234.000" | 234
| data-sort-value="239.003" | 3.
| data-sort-value="1738-07-01" | 1738
| Kyrie–Gloria Mass
| A maj.
| data-sort-value="sabSATB Flx2 Str Bc" | sabSATB 2Fl Str Bc
| data-sort-value="000.08: 051" | 8: 51
| data-sort-value="II/02: 001" | II/2: 1
| data-sort-value="after BWV 0067/6" | after BWV 67/6, 138/5, 179/5, 79/2; text from Ordinarium Missae
| 
|- style="background: #F5F6CE;"
| data-sort-value="0235.000" | 235
| data-sort-value="241.001" | 3.
| data-sort-value="1738-12-31" | 1738–1739?
| Kyrie–Gloria Mass
| G min.
| data-sort-value="atbSATB Obx2 Str Bc" | atbSATB 2Ob Str Bc
| data-sort-value="000.08: 099" | 8: 99
| data-sort-value="II/02: 127" | II/2: 127
| data-sort-value="after BWV 0102/1" | after BWV 102/1, 72/1, 187/4, /3, /5, /1; text from Ordinarium Missae
| 
|- style="background: #E3F6CE;"
| data-sort-value="0236.000" | 236
| data-sort-value="242.002" | 3.
| data-sort-value="1738-12-31" | 1738–1739?
| Kyrie–Gloria Mass
| G maj.
| data-sort-value="satbSATB Obx2 Str Bc" | satbSATB 2Ob Str Bc
| data-sort-value="000.08: 155" | 8: 155
| data-sort-value="II/02: 061" | II/2: 61
| data-sort-value="after BWV 0179/1" | after BWV 179/1, /3, 79/1, /5, 138/5, 17/1; text from Ordinarium Missae
| 
|- style="background: #E3F6CE;"
| data-sort-value="1081.000" | 1081
| data-sort-value="243.002" | 3.
| data-sort-value="1747-10-31" | 1747 – Aug. 1748
| Credo intonation for Mass No. 5 in F major of G. B. Bassani's Acroama Missale
| F maj.
| SATB Bc
| 
| data-sort-value="II/02" | II/2
| data-sort-value="→ BNB I/B/48" | → BNB I/B/48; text from Credo
| 
|- style="background: #E3F6CE;"
| data-sort-value="0237.000" | 237
| data-sort-value="243.003" | 3.
| data-sort-value="1723-06-24" | 1723-06-24?
| Sanctus
| C maj.
| data-sort-value="SATB 3Tr Tmp Obx2 Str Bc" | SATB 3Tr Tmp 2Ob Str Bc
| data-sort-value="000.11 1: 067" | 111: 67
| data-sort-value="II/02: 311" | II/2: 311
| text from Sanctus
| 
|- style="background: #E3F6CE;"
| data-sort-value="0238.000" | 238
| data-sort-value="244.001" | 3.
| data-sort-value="1723-12-25" | 1723-12-251736–1737
| Sanctus
| D maj.
| SATB Cnt Str Bc
| data-sort-value="000.11 1: 079" | 111: 79
| data-sort-value="II/02: 325" | II/2: 325
| text from Sanctus
| 
|- style="background: #E3F6CE;"
| data-sort-value="0240.000" | 240
| data-sort-value="244.003" | 3.
| data-sort-value="1742-07-01" | 1742 (JSB)
| Sanctus
| G maj.
| data-sort-value="SATB Obx2 Str Bc" | SATB 2Ob Str Bc
| data-sort-value="000.11 1: 093" | 111: 93
| data-sort-value="II/09: 003" | II/9: 3
| text from Sanctus
| 
|- style="background: #E3F6CE;"
| data-sort-value="0241.000" | 241
| data-sort-value="244.004" | 3.
| data-sort-value="1747-12-31" | Jul. 1747 – Aug. 1748 (JSB)
| Sanctus of Missa superba
| D maj.
| data-sort-value="SATBx2 Obax2 Vlx2 Vax3 Bas Vc Vne Bc" | 2SATB 2Oba 2Vl 3Va Bas Vc Vne Bc
| data-sort-value="000.41: 177" | 41: 177
| data-sort-value="II/09: 045" | II/9: 45
| after Kerll; text from Sanctus
| 
|- style="background: #E3F6CE;"
| data-sort-value="0242.000" | 242
| data-sort-value="245.002" | 3.
| data-sort-value="1729-12-31" | 1727–1732 (JSB)
| Christe eleison for a Kyrie-Gloria Mass in C minor by F. Durante
| G min.
| SA Bc
| data-sort-value="000.41: 197" | 41: 197
| data-sort-value="II/02: 295" | II/2: 295
| data-sort-value="→ BWV Anh. 026" | text from Kyrie; → BWV Anh. 26/2
| 
|- style="background: #E3F6CE;"
| data-sort-value="0243.200" | 243.2
| data-sort-value="246.002" | 3.
| data-sort-value="1733-07-02" | 1733-07-02?1732–1735
| Magnificat (2nd version: Visitation?)
| D maj.
| data-sort-value="ssatbSSATB Trx3 Tmp Flx2 Obx2 Obax2 Str Bas Vc Vne Bc" | ssatbSSATB 3Tr Tmp 2Fl 2Ob 2Oba Str Bas Vc Vne Bc
| data-sort-value="000.11 1: 001" | 111: 1
| data-sort-value="II/03: 065" | II/3: 65
| data-sort-value="after BWV 0243.1" | after BWV 243.1 (same text)
| 
|- style="background: #E3F6CE;"
| data-sort-value="0243.100" | 243.1
| data-sort-value="247.002" | 3.
| data-sort-value="1723-07-02" | 1723-07-021723-12-25
| Magnificat (1st version:Visitation, and with 4 laudes added: Christmas)
| E♭ maj.
| data-sort-value="ssatbSSATB Trx3 Tmp Flx2 Obx2 Str Bc" | ssatbSSATB 3Tr Tmp 2Fl 2Ob Str Bc
| data-sort-value="000.11 1: 103" | 111: 103
| data-sort-value="II/03: 001" | II/3: 1
| after Magnificat peregrini toni (/10); text: Magnificat; → BWV 243.2
| 
|- style="background: #E3F6CE;"
| data-sort-value="1082.000" | 1082
| data-sort-value="249.002" | 3.
| data-sort-value="1741-09-15" | 1740–1742 (JSB)
| Suscepit Israel from a Magnificat by A. Caldara
| E min.
| data-sort-value="SATB Vlx2 Bc" | SATB 2Vl Bc
| 
| data-sort-value="II/09: 059" | II/9: 59
| after Caldara (BNB I/C/1); text from Magnificat
| 
|- style="background: #E3F6CE;"
| data-sort-value="1083.000" | 1083
| data-sort-value="249.003" | 3.
| data-sort-value="1746-07-01" | 1745–1747 (JSB)
| Cantata Tilge, Höchster, meine Sünden
| 
| data-sort-value="sa Vlx2 Str Vne Vc Bc" | sa 2Vl Str Vne Vc Bc
| 
| I/41: 169
| after Pergolesi (Stabat Mater); text after Ps. 51
| 
|- id="BWV Chapter 4" style="background: #D8D8D8;"
| data-sort-value="0243.z99" | 4.
| data-sort-value="251.001" colspan="8" | Passions, Oratorios (see also: List of Passions and Oratorios by Johann Sebastian Bach)
| data-sort-value="0303a" | Up ↑
|- style="background: #E3F6CE;"
| data-sort-value="0244.200" | 244.2
| data-sort-value="251.002" | 4.
| data-sort-value="1736-03-30" | 1736-03-3017421743–1746
| Passion St Matthew Passion (later versions; Good Friday)
| E min.
| data-sort-value="satbx2SATBx2 Flx2 Flx4 Obx4 Obax4 Odcx2 Strx2 Vdgx2 Bcx2" | 2satb2SATB 2Fl 4Fl 4Ob 4Oba 2Odc 2Str 2Vdg 2Bc
| data-sort-value="000.04: 001" | 444: 58
| data-sort-value="II/05" | II/5
| after BWV 244.1, 245.2 (/29); text by Picander, Decius (/1), Heermann (/3, /19, /46), Gerhardt (/10, /15, /17, /37, /44, /54, /62), Albert of Prussia (/25), Heyden (/29), Reusner (/32), Rist (/40), after Mt 26–27, Sng 6:1 (/30)
| 
|-
| data-sort-value="0244.100" | 244a
| data-sort-value="261.001" | 

| data-sort-value="1729-03-24" | 

| data-sort-value="Cantata Klagt, Kinder, klagt es aller Welt (funeral of Leopold of Anhalt-Köthen; music lost but partially reconstructable)" | 

| 

| 

| 

| data-sort-value="I/34" | 

| see BWV 1143
| 
|- style="background: #E3F6CE;"
| data-sort-value="0244.101" | 244.1
| data-sort-value="262.002" rowspan="17" | 4.
| data-sort-value="1727-04-11" rowspan="17" | 1727-04-11
| Passion St Matthew Passion (early version; Good Friday)
| E min.
| data-sort-value="satbSATBx2 Flx4 Obx4 Obax4 Odcx2 Strx2 Lu Bc" | satb2SATB 4Fl 4Ob 4Oba 2Odc 2Str Lu Bc
| 
| data-sort-value="II/05a" | II/5aII/5b
| after Z 4361a (/1), 983 (/3, /19, /46), 2293b (/10, /37), 5385a (/15, /17, /44, /54, /62), 7568 (/25), 3449 (/29), 2461c (/32), 6551 (/40); text by Picander, Heermann (/3, /19, /46), Gerhardt (/10, /15, /17, /37, /44, /54, /62), Albert of Prussia (/25), Keymann (/29), Reusner (/32), Rist (/40), after Mt 26–27, Sng 6:1 (/30); ↔ BWV 198, 1143; → BWV 244.2
| 
|- style="background: #E3F6CE;"
| data-sort-value="0244.103" | 244/3
| chorale setting "Herzliebster Jesu" (s. 1)
| B min.
| SATB
| data-sort-value="000.04: 023" | 4: 23
| data-sort-value="III/02 2: 043" | III/2.2: 43
| data-sort-value="after Z 0983; text by Heermann" | after Z 983; text by Heermann
| 
|- style="background: #E3F6CE;"
| data-sort-value="0244.110" rowspan="2" | 244/10
| chorale setting "O Welt, sieh hier dein Leben" (s. 5)
| rowspan="2" | A♭ maj.
| rowspan="2" | SATB
| data-sort-value="000.04: 042" rowspan="2" | 4: 42
| data-sort-value="III/02 2: 066" rowspan="2" | III/2.2: 66
| rowspan="2" | after Z 2293b; text by Gerhardt
| rowspan="2" | 
|- style="background: #E3F6CE;"
| chorale setting "Nun ruhen alle Wälder"
|- style="background: #E3F6CE;"
| data-sort-value="0244.115" | 244/15
| chorale setting "O Haupt voll Blut und Wunden" (s. 5)
| E maj.D maj.
| rowspan="2" | SATB
| data-sort-value="000.04: 051" | 4: 51
| data-sort-value="III/02 2: 055" rowspan="2" | III/2.2: 55
| rowspan="2" | after Z 5385a; text by Gerhardt
| rowspan="2" | 
|- style="background: #E3F6CE;"
| data-sort-value="0244.117" | 244/17
| chorale setting "O Haupt voll Blut und Wunden" (s. 6; in BWV 244.1: s. 7?)
| E♭ maj.D maj.
| data-sort-value="000.04: 053" | 4: 53
|- style="background: #E3F6CE;"
| data-sort-value="0244.125" | 244/25
| chorale setting "Was mein Gott will, das gscheh allzeit" (s. 1)
| B min.
| SATB
| data-sort-value="000.04: 083" | 4: 83
| data-sort-value="III/02 2: 064" | III/2.2: 64
| after Z 7568; text by Albert of Prussia
| 
|- style="background: #E3F6CE;"
| data-sort-value="0244.132" | 244/32
| chorale setting "In dich hab ich gehoffet, Herr" (s. 5)
| B♭ maj.
| SATB
| data-sort-value="000.04: 151" | 4: 151
| data-sort-value="III/02 2: 066" | III/2.2: 66
| after Z 2461c; text by Reusner
| 
|- style="background: #E3F6CE;"
| data-sort-value="0244.137" rowspan="2" | 244/37
| chorale setting "O Welt, sieh hier dein Leben" (s. 3)
| rowspan="2" | F maj.
| rowspan="2" | SATB
| data-sort-value="000.04: 164" rowspan="2" | 4: 164
| data-sort-value="III/02 2: 029" rowspan="2" | III/2.2: 29
| after Z 2293b; text by Gerhardt
| rowspan="2" | 
|- style="background: #E3F6CE;"
| chorale setting "In allen meinen Taten"
| after Z 2293b; text by Fleming
|- style="background: #E3F6CE;"
| data-sort-value="0244.140" rowspan="2" | 244/40
| chorale setting "Werde munter, mein Gemüte" (s. 6)
| rowspan="2" | A maj.
| rowspan="2" | SATB
| data-sort-value="000.04: 173" rowspan="2" | 4: 173
| rowspan="2" data-sort-value="III/02 1: 139" | III/2.1: 95III/2.2: 68
| after Z 6551; text by Rist
| rowspan="2" | 
|- style="background: #E3F6CE;"
| chorale setting "Jesu, meiner Seelen Wonne"
| after Z 6551; text by Janus
|- style="background: #E3F6CE;"
| data-sort-value="0244.144" rowspan="2" | 244/44
| chorale setting "Befiehl du deine Wege" (s. 1)
| rowspan="2" | D maj.
| rowspan="2" | SATB
| data-sort-value="000.04: 186" rowspan="2" | 4: 186
| data-sort-value="III/02 2: 049" rowspan="2" | III/2.2: 49
| rowspan="2" | after Z 5385a; text by Gerhardt
| rowspan="2" | 
|- style="background: #E3F6CE;"
| chorale setting "O Haupt voll Blut und Wunden"
|- style="background: #E3F6CE;"
| data-sort-value="0244.146" | 244/46
| chorale setting "Herzliebster Jesu" (s. 4)
| B min.
| SATB
| data-sort-value="000.04: 192" | 4: 192
| data-sort-value="III/02 2: 059" | III/2.2: 59
| data-sort-value="after Z 0983; text by Heermann" | after Z 983; text by Heermann
| 
|- style="background: #E3F6CE;"
| data-sort-value="0244.154" | 244/54
| chorale setting "O Haupt voll Blut und Wunden" (ss. 1–2)
| F maj.
| SATB
| data-sort-value="000.04: 214" | 4: 214
| data-sort-value="III/02 2: 041" | III/2.2: 41
| rowspan="2" | after Z 5385a; text by Gerhardt
| 
|- style="background: #E3F6CE;"
| data-sort-value="0244.162" | 244/62
| chorale setting "O Haupt voll Blut und Wunden" (s. 9)
| A min.B min.
| SATB
| data-sort-value="000.04: 248" | 4: 248
| data-sort-value="III/02 2: 050" | III/2.2: 50
| 
|- style="background: #E3F6CE;"
| data-sort-value="0245.100" | 245.1
| data-sort-value="262.003" rowspan="16" | 4.
| rowspan="2" | 1724-04-07
| Passion St John Passion (1st version; Good Friday)
| G min.
| data-sort-value="satbSATB Flx2 Obx2 Odcx2 Str Vax2 Vdg Lu Bc" | satbSATB (2Fl?) 2Ob 2Odc Str 2Va Vdg Lu Bc
| data-sort-value="000.12 1: 001" | 12144: 26
| data-sort-value="II/04: 040" | II/4: 40
| data-sort-value="after Z 0983 (/3)" | after Z 983 (/3, /17), 2561 (/5), 2293b (/11), 6288a–b (/14, /28, /32), 6283b (/15, /37), 2383 (/22), 5404a (/26), 8326 (/40); text after Jh 18–19, Mt 26:75 (/12), Mk 15:38 (/33), by Heermann (/3, /17), Luther (/5), Brockes (/7, /19, /20, /24, /32, /34, /35, /39), Gerhardt (/11), Weise (/13), Stockmann (/14, /28, /32), Weiße (/15, /37), Postel (/19, /22, /30), Herberger (/26), Schalling (/40); → BWV 245.2–5
| 
|- style="background: #E3F6CE;"
| data-sort-value="0245.102" | 245.1/3
| rowspan="2" | chorale setting "Herzliebster Jesu" (s. 7)
| rowspan="2" | G min.
| rowspan="2" | SATB
| 
| data-sort-value="III/02 1: 136" | III/2.1: 93
| rowspan="2" data-sort-value="after Z 0983; text by Heermann" | after Z 983; text by Heermann
| rowspan="2" | 
|- style="background: #E3F6CE;"
| data-sort-value="0245.103" | 245/3
| data-sort-value="1740-07-01" | 
| data-sort-value="000.12 1: 017" | 121: 17
| data-sort-value="III/02 2: 033" | III/2.2: 33
|- style="background: #E3F6CE;"
| data-sort-value="0245.104" | 245.1/5
| 1724-04-07
| rowspan="2" | chorale setting "Vater unser im Himmelreich" (s. 4)
| rowspan="2" | D min.
| rowspan="2" | SATB
| 
| data-sort-value="III/02 1: 137" | III/2.1: 94III/2.2: 27
| after Z 2561; text by Luther after Mt 6:9–13; ↔ BWV 416
| rowspan="2" | 
|- style="background: #E3F6CE;"
| data-sort-value="0245.105" | 245/5
| data-sort-value="1740-07-01" | 
| data-sort-value="000.12 1: 018" | 121: 18
| 
| after Z 2561; text by Luther after Mt 6:9–13
|- style="background: #E3F6CE;"
| data-sort-value="0245.111" rowspan="2" | 245/11
| rowspan="11" | 1724-04-07
| chorale setting "O Welt, sieh hier dein Leben" (ss. 3–4)
| rowspan="2" | A maj.
| rowspan="2" | SATB
| data-sort-value="000.12 1: 031" rowspan="2" | 121: 31
| data-sort-value="III/02 1: 138" rowspan="2" | III/2.1: 94III/2.2: 35
| rowspan="2" | after Z 2293b; text by Gerhardt; → BWV 395
| rowspan="2" | 
|- style="background: #E3F6CE;"
| chorale setting "Nun ruhen alle Wälder"
|- style="background: #E3F6CE;"
| data-sort-value="0245.114" | 245/14
| chorale setting "Jesu Leiden, Pein und Tod" (s. 10)
| A maj.
| SATB
| data-sort-value="000.12 1: 039" | 121: 39
| data-sort-value="III/02 2: 046" | III/2.2: 46
| after Z 6288a–b; text by Stockmann
| 
|- style="background: #E3F6CE;"
| data-sort-value="0245.115" | 245/15
| chorale setting "Christus, der uns selig macht" (s. 1)
| A min.
| SATB
| data-sort-value="000.12 1: 043" | 121: 43
| data-sort-value="III/02 2: 044" | III/2.2: 44
| after Z 6283b; text by Weiße after "Patris sapientia"
| 
|- style="background: #E3F6CE;"
| data-sort-value="0245.117" | 245/17
| chorale setting "Herzliebster Jesu" (ss. 8–9)
| A min.
| SATB
| data-sort-value="000.12 1: 052" | 121: 52
| data-sort-value="III/02 1: 140" | III/2.1: 95III/2.2: 62
| data-sort-value="after Z 0983; text by Heermann" | after Z 983; text by Heermann
| 
|- style="background: #E3F6CE;"
| data-sort-value="0245.122" rowspan="2" | 245/22
| chorale setting "Durch dein Gefängnis Gottes Sohn"
| rowspan="2" | E maj.
| rowspan="2" | SATB
| data-sort-value="000.12 1: 074" rowspan="2" | 121: 74
| rowspan="2" data-sort-value="III/02 2: 181" | III/2.2: 181
| after Z 2383; text by Postel
| rowspan="2" | 
|- style="background: #E3F6CE;"
| chorale setting "Machs mit mir, Gott, nach deiner Güt"
| after Z 2383; text by Schein
|- style="background: #E3F6CE;"
| data-sort-value="0245.126" | 245/26
| chorale setting "Valet will ich dir geben" (s. 3)
| E♭ maj.
| SATB
| data-sort-value="000.12 1: 095" | 121: 95
| data-sort-value="III/02 1: 142" | III/2.1: 96III/2.2: 60
| after Z 5404a; text by Herberger
| 
|- style="background: #E3F6CE;"
| data-sort-value="0245.128" | 245/28
| chorale setting "Jesu Leiden, Pein und Tod" (s. 20)
| A maj.
| SATB
| data-sort-value="000.12 1: 103" | 121: 103
| data-sort-value="III/02 2: 059" | III/2.2: 59
| after Z 6288a–b; text by Stockmann
| 
|- style="background: #E3F6CE;"
| data-sort-value="0245.137" | 245/37
| chorale setting "Christus, der uns selig macht" (s. 8)
| B♭ min.
| SATB
| data-sort-value="000.12 1: 121" | 121: 121
| data-sort-value="III/02 2: 063" | III/2.2: 63
| after Z 6283b; text by Weiße after "Patris sapientia"
| 
|- style="background: #E3F6CE;"
| data-sort-value="0245.140" | 245/40
| chorale setting "Herzlich lieb hab ich dich, o Herr" (s. 3)
| E♭ maj.
| SATB
| data-sort-value="000.12 1: 131" | 121: 131
| data-sort-value="III/02 2: 060" | III/2.2: 60
| after Z 8326; text by Schalling
| 
|- style="background: #E3F6CE;"
| data-sort-value="0245.200" | 245.2
| data-sort-value="262.004" | 4.
| 1725-03-30
| Passion St John Passion (2nd version; Good Friday)
| E♭ maj.
| data-sort-value="satbSATB Flx2 Obx2 Odcx2 Str Vdg Bc" | satbSATB 2Fl 2Ob 2Odc Str Vdg Bc
| data-sort-value="000.12 1: 001" | 121
| data-sort-value="II/04: 167" | II/4: 167
| after Z 8303 (/1), BWV 245.1, 23/4 (/40); text by Heyden (/1), Heermann (/3, /17), Luther (/5, /40), Brockes (/7, /24, /32, /34, /35, /39), Gerhardt (/11), Birkmann (a, b, c) Stockmann (a, /14, /28, /32), Weiße (/15, /37), Postel (/22, /30), Herberger (/26), after Jh 18–19, Mt 26:75 (/12), Mt 27:51 (/33); → BWV 245.3; /1 → BWV 244.2/29,
| 
|- style="background: #E3F6CE;"
| data-sort-value="0245.300" | 245.3
| data-sort-value="262.005" | 4.
| 1732-04-11
| Passion St John Passion (3rd version; Good Friday)
| 
| data-sort-value="satbSATB Flx2 Obx2 Str Vdg Org Bc" | satbSATB 2Fl 2Ob Str Vdg Org Bc
| data-sort-value="000.12 1: 001" | 12144: 26
| data-sort-value="II/04: 206" | II/4: 206
| data-sort-value="after BWV 0245.1–.2" | after BWV 245.1–.2; text after Jh 18–19, by Heermann (/3, /17), Luther (/5), Brockes (/7, /19, /20, /24, /32, /39), Gerhardt (/11), Stockmann (/14, /28, /32), Weiße (/15, /37), Postel (/19, /22, /30), Herberger (/26); → BWV 245.4–5
| 
|- style="background: #E3F6CE;"
| data-sort-value="0245.400" | 245.4
| data-sort-value="262.007" | 4.
| data-sort-value="1739-01-01" | 1739
| Passion St John Passion (incomplete revision)
| 
| data-sort-value="satbSATB Fl Obx2 Str Bc" | satbSATB Fl 2Ob Str Bc
| data-sort-value="000.12 1: 001" | 12144: 26
| data-sort-value="II/04: 040" | II/4
| data-sort-value="after BWV 0245.1–.3" | after BWV 245.1–.3; text by Heyden (/1), Heermann (/3), Luther (/5), after Jh 18; → BWV 245.5
| 
|- style="background: #E3F6CE;"
| data-sort-value="0245.500" | 245.5
| data-sort-value="262.006" | 4.
| 1749-04-04
| Passion St John Passion (4th version; Good Friday)
| 
| data-sort-value="satbSATB Flx2 Obx2 Obax2 Odc Bas Str Vdg Hc Bc" | satbSATB 2Fl 2Ob 2Oba Odc Bas Str Vdg Hc Bc
| data-sort-value="000.12 1: 001" | 12144: 26
| data-sort-value="II/04: 000" | II/4
| data-sort-value="after BWV 0245.1–4" | after BWV 245.1–4; text after Jh 18–19, Mt 26:75 (/12), Mt 27:51 (/33), by Heermann (/3, /17), Luther (/5), Brockes (/7, /19, /24, /32, /34, /35, /39), Gerhardt (/11), Weise (/13), Stockmann (/14, /28, /32), Weiße (/15, /37), Postel (/19, /22, /30), Herberger (/26), Schalling (/40)
| 
|- id="BWV 246/40a" style="background: #E3F6CE;"
| data-sort-value="0246.140" | 246/40a
| data-sort-value="269.006" | 4.
| data-sort-value="1744-07-01" | 1743–1745 (JSB)
| Chorale Aus der Tiefen rufe ich, No. 40 of St Luke Passion
| 
| t Str Bc (?)
| 
| data-sort-value="II/09: 065" | II/9: 65
| data-sort-value="after BWV 0246/40" | after BWV 246/40
| 
|-
| data-sort-value="0247.000" | 247
| data-sort-value="270.002" | 4.
| data-sort-value="1731-03-23" | 1731-03-231744-04-03
| Passion St Mark Passion (Good Friday; music lost but in part reconstructable)
| 
| data-sort-value="satbSATB Flx2 Obx2 Obax2 Vlx2 Vax2 Vdgx2 Lux2 Org Bc" | satbSATB 2Fl 2Ob 2Oba 2Vl 2Va (2Vdg 2Lu) Org Bc (?)
| 
| data-sort-value="II/05" | II/5
| text by Picander, Jonas, Reusner, Gerhardt, Rist, Schein, Stockmann, Franck, J., Luther, Spee; after BWV 198/1, /5, /3, /8, /10 (or 244a/7), 54/1, 248/28?, /45, 7/2?
| 
|-
| data-sort-value="1088.000" | 1088
| data-sort-value="271.002" | 4.
| data-sort-value="1750-07-01" | 1750?
| Arioso So heb ich denn mein Auge sehnlich auf, No. 20 in Passion Oratorio Wer ist der, so von Edom kömmt (Good Friday)
| 
| data-sort-value="b Basx2 Bc" | b 2Bas Bc (?)
| 
| I/41: 125
| 
| 
|- id="Christmas Oratorio" style="background: #E3F6CE;"
| data-sort-value="0248.000" | 248
| data-sort-value="272.000" | 4.
| data-sort-value="1735-01-06" | 1734-12-25 – 1735-01-06
| Oratorio Christmas Oratorio (Christmastide)
| D maj.
| data-sort-value="satbSATB Trx3 Hnx2 Tmp Flx2 Obx2 Obax2 Odcx2 Str Bc" | satbSATB 3Tr 2Hn Tmp 2Fl 2Ob 2Oba 2Odc Str Bc  
| data-sort-value="000.05 1: 000" | 5144: 125
| data-sort-value="II/06: 000" | II/6
| data-sort-value="after BWV 0214 (/1, /8, /15, /24)" | after BWV 214 (/1, /8, /15, /24), 213 (/4, /19, /29, /36, /39, /41), 215 (/47), 248VIa (/54, /56–/57, /61–/64), Z 5385a (/5, /64), 1947 (/7, /28), 346 (/9, /17, /23), 5741b (/12), 6462 (/33), 2072 (/35), 2461c (/46), 3614b (/53), 4429a (/59); text by Picander?, Gerhardt (/5, /17, /23, /33, /59), Luther (/7, /9, /28), Rist (/12, /38, /40, /42),  (/35), Weissel (/46), Franck, J. (/53), Werner (/64), after Lk 2:1–21, Mt 2:1–12
| 
|- style="background: #E3F6CE;"
| data-sort-value="0248.100" | 248I
| data-sort-value="272.001" rowspan="4" | 4.
| rowspan="4" | 1734-12-25
| Cantata Jauchzet, frohlocket, auf, preiset die Tage (Christmas Oratorio, Part I; Christmas)
| D maj.
| data-sort-value="satbSATB Trx3 Tmp Flx2 Obx2 Obax2 Str Bc" | satbSATB 3Tr Tmp 2Fl 2Ob 2Oba Str Bc  
| data-sort-value="000.05 1: 002" | 51: 244: 125
| data-sort-value="II/06: 001" | II/6: 1
| data-sort-value="after BWV 0214/1 & /7" | after BWV 214/1 & /7 (/1 & /8), 213/9 (/4), Z 5385a (/5), 1947 (/7), 346 (/9); text by Picander?, Gerhardt (/5), Luther (/7, /9), after Lk 2:1, 3–7
| 
|- style="background: #E3F6CE;"
| data-sort-value="0248.105" rowspan="2" | 248/5
| chorale setting "Wie soll ich dich empfangen" (s. 1)
| rowspan="2" | A min.
| rowspan="2" | SATB
| data-sort-value="000.05 1: 036" rowspan="2" | 51: 36
| data-sort-value="III/02 2: 199" rowspan="2" | III/2.2: 199
| rowspan="2" | after Z 5385a; text by Gerhardt
| rowspan="2" | 
|- style="background: #E3F6CE;"
| chorale setting "O Haupt voll Blut und Wunden"
|- style="background: #E3F6CE;"
| data-sort-value="0248.109" | 248/9
| chorale setting "Vom Himmel hoch da komm ich her" (s. 13)
| D maj.
| SATB
| data-sort-value="000.05 1: 047" | 51: 47
| data-sort-value="III/02 2: 026" | III/2.2: 26
| data-sort-value="after Z 0346; text by Luther" | after Z 346; text by Luther
| 
|- style="background: #E3F6CE;"
| data-sort-value="0248.200" | 248II
| data-sort-value="272.002" rowspan="7" | 4.
| rowspan="7" | 1734-12-26
| Cantata Und es waren Hirten in derselben Gegend (Christmas Oratorio, Part II; Christmas 2)
| G maj.
| data-sort-value="satbSATB Flx2 Obax2 Odcx2 Str Bc" | satbSATB 2Fl 2Oba 2Odc Str Bc  
| data-sort-value="000.05 1: 050" | 51: 5044: 126
| data-sort-value="II/06: 055" | II/6: 55
| after Z 5741b (/3), 346 (/8, /14), BWV 214/5 (/6), 213/3 (/10); text by Picander?, Rist (/3), Gerhardt (/8, /14), after Lk 2: 8–14
| 
|- style="background: #E3F6CE;"
| data-sort-value="0248.212" rowspan="2" | 248/12
| chorale setting "Ermuntre dich, mein schwacher Geist" (s. 9)
| rowspan="2" | G maj.
| rowspan="2" | SATB
| data-sort-value="000.05 1: 059" rowspan="2" | 51: 59
| rowspan="2" data-sort-value="III/02 1: 119, 134" | III/2.1: 83, 92III/2.2: 7, 207
| rowspan="2" | after Z 5741b; text by Rist
| rowspan="2" | 
|- style="background: #E3F6CE;"
| chorale setting "Du Lebensfürst, Herr Jesu Christ"
|- style="background: #E3F6CE;"
| data-sort-value="0248.217" rowspan="2" | 248/17
| chorale setting "Schaut, schaut, was ist für Wunder dar" (s. 8)
| rowspan="2" | C maj.
| rowspan="2" | SATB
| data-sort-value="000.05 1: 066" rowspan="2" | 51: 66
| rowspan="2" data-sort-value="III/02 1: 120" | III/2.1: 84
| data-sort-value="after Z 0346; text by Gerhardt" | after Z 346; text by Gerhardt
| rowspan="2" | 
|- style="background: #E3F6CE;"
| chorale setting "Vom Himmel hoch da komm ich her"
| data-sort-value="after Z 0346; text by Luther" | after Z 346; text by Luther
|- style="background: #E3F6CE;"
| data-sort-value="0248.223" rowspan="2" | 248/23
| chorale setting "Wir singen dir, Immanuel" (s. 2)
| rowspan="2" | G maj.
| rowspan="2" | SATB
| data-sort-value="000.05 1: 090" rowspan="2" | 51: 90
| rowspan="2" data-sort-value="III/02 2: 198" | III/2.2: 198
| data-sort-value="after Z 0346; text by Gerhardt" | after Z 346; text by Gerhardt
| rowspan="2" | 
|- style="background: #E3F6CE;"
| chorale setting "Vom Himmel hoch da komm ich her"
| data-sort-value="after Z 0346; text by Luther" | after Z 346; text by Luther
|- style="background: #E3F6CE;"
| data-sort-value="0248.300" | 248III
| data-sort-value="272.003" rowspan="6" | 4.
| rowspan="6" | 1734-12-27
| Cantata Herrscher des Himmels, erhöre das Lallen (Christmas Oratorio, Part III; Christmas 3)
| D maj.
| data-sort-value="satbSATB Trx3 Tmp Flx2 Obx2 Obax2 Str Bc" | satbSATB 3Tr Tmp 2Fl 2Ob 2Oba Str Bc  
| data-sort-value="000.05 1: 094" | 51: 94
| data-sort-value="II/06: 107" | II/6: 107
| data-sort-value="after BWV 0214/9" | after BWV 214/9 (/1=/13), 213/11 (/6), Z 1947 (/5), 6462 (/10), 2072 (/12); text by Picander?, Luther (/5), Gerhardt (/10),  (/12), after Lk 2: 15–20
| 
|- style="background: #E3F6CE;"
| data-sort-value="0248.328" | 248/28
| chorale setting "Gelobet seist du, Jesu Christ" (s. 7)
| D maj.
| SATB
| data-sort-value="000.05 1: 110" | 51: 110
| data-sort-value="III/02 1: 123" | III/2.1: 85
| after Z 1947; text by Luther
| 
|- style="background: #E3F6CE;"
| data-sort-value="0248.333" rowspan="2" | 248/33
| chorale setting "Fröhlich soll mein Herze springen" (s. 15)
| rowspan="2" | G maj.
| rowspan="2" | SATB
| data-sort-value="000.05 1: 124" rowspan="2" | 51: 124
| rowspan="2" data-sort-value="III/02 1: 125" | III/2.1: 86III/2.2: 81
| rowspan="2" | after Z 6462; text by Gerhardt
| rowspan="2" | 
|- style="background: #E3F6CE;"
| chorale setting "Warum sollt ich mich denn grämen"
|- style="background: #E3F6CE;"
| data-sort-value="0248.335" rowspan="2" | 248/35
| chorale setting "Laßt Furcht und Pein" (s. 4)
| rowspan="2" | F♯ min.
| rowspan="2" | SATB
| data-sort-value="000.05 1: 126" rowspan="2" | 51: 126
| rowspan="2" data-sort-value="III/02 1: 124" | III/2.1: 86III/2.2: 206
| after Z 2072; text by 
| rowspan="2" | 
|- style="background: #E3F6CE;"
| chorale setting "Wir Christenleut"
| after Z 2072; text by Füger
|- style="background: #E3F6CE;"
| data-sort-value="0248.400" | 248IV
| data-sort-value="272.004" rowspan="3" | 4.
| rowspan="3" | 1735-01-01
| Cantata Fallt mit Danken, fallt mit Loben (Christmas Oratorio, Part IV; New Year)
| rowspan="3" | F maj.
| data-sort-value="satbSATB Hnx2 Obx2 Str Bc" | satbSATB 2Hn 2Ob Str Bc  
| data-sort-value="000.05 1: 128" | 51: 128
| data-sort-value="II/06: 143" | II/6: 143
| data-sort-value="after BWV 0213/1, /5, /7" | after BWV 213/1, /5, /7 (/1, /4, /6); text by Picander?, Rist (/3, /5, /7), after Lk 2: 21
| 
|- style="background: #E3F6CE;"
| data-sort-value="0248.442" rowspan="2" | 248/42
| chorale setting "Hilf, Herr Jesu, laß gelingen" (s. 15)
| rowspan="2" | SATB
| data-sort-value="000.05 1: 166" rowspan="2" | 51: 166
| rowspan="2" data-sort-value="III/02 1: 146" | III/2.1: 99III/2.2: 211
| text by Rist
| rowspan="2" | 
|- style="background: #E3F6CE;"
| chorale setting "Jesu, meiner Seelen Wonne"
| text by Janus
|- style="background: #E3F6CE;"
| data-sort-value="0248.500" | 248V
| data-sort-value="272.005" rowspan="5" | 4.
| rowspan="5" | 1735-01-02
| Cantata Ehre sei dir, Gott, gesungen (Christmas Oratorio, Part V; New Year I)
| rowspan="5" | A maj.
| data-sort-value="satbSATB Obax2 Str Bc" | satbSATB 2Oba Str Bc  
| data-sort-value="000.05 1: 172" | 51: 172
| data-sort-value="II/06: 199" | II/6: 199
| data-sort-value="after BWV 0247/39b" | after BWV 247/39b (/3), 215/7 (/5), Z 2461c (/4), 3614b (/11); text by Picander?, Weissel (/4), Franck, J. (/11), after Mt 2:1–6
| 
|- style="background: #E3F6CE;"
| data-sort-value="0248.546" rowspan="2" | 248/46
| chorale setting "Nun, liebe Seel, nun ist es Zeit" (s. 5)
| rowspan="2" | SATB
| data-sort-value="000.05 1: 190" rowspan="2" | 51: 190
| rowspan="2" data-sort-value="III/02 1: 126" | III/2.1: 87III/2.2: 43
| after Z 2461c; text by Weissel
| rowspan="2" | 
|- style="background: #E3F6CE;"
| chorale setting "In dich hab ich gehoffet, Herr"
| after Z 2461c; text by Reusner
|- style="background: #E3F6CE;"
| data-sort-value="0248.553" rowspan="2" | 248/53
| chorale setting "Ihr Gestirn, ihr hohlen Lüfte" (s. 9)
| rowspan="2" | SATB
| data-sort-value="000.05 1: 208" rowspan="2" | 51: 208
| rowspan="2" data-sort-value="III/02 1: 147" | III/2.1: 100III/2.2: 21
| after Z 3614b; text by Franck, J.
| rowspan="2" | 
|- style="background: #E3F6CE;"
| chorale setting "Gott des Himmels und der Erden"
| after Z 3614b; text by Albert
|- style="background: #E3F6CE;"
| data-sort-value="0248.600" | 248VI
| data-sort-value="272.006" rowspan="5" | 4.
| rowspan="5" | 1735-01-06
| Cantata Herr, wenn die stolzen Feinde schnauben (Christmas Oratorio, Part VI; Epiphany)
| D maj.
| data-sort-value="satbSATB Trx3 Tmp Obx2 Obax2 Str Bc" | satbSATB 3Tr Tmp 2Ob 2Oba Str Bc  
| data-sort-value="000.05 1: 210" | 51: 210
| data-sort-value="II/06: 243" | II/6: 243
| data-sort-value="after BWV 0248 VI a" | after BWV 248VIa (/1, /3, /4, /8–/11), Z 4429a (/6), 5385a (/11); text by Picander?, Gerhardt (/6), Werner (/11), after Mt 2:7–12
| 
|- style="background: #E3F6CE;"
| data-sort-value="0248.659" rowspan="2" | 248/59
| chorale setting "Ich steh an deiner Krippen hier" (s. 1)
| rowspan="2" | G maj.
| rowspan="2" | SATB
| data-sort-value="000.05 1: 245" rowspan="2" | 51: 245
| rowspan="2" data-sort-value="III/02 1: 121" | III/2.1: 84III/2.2: 208
| after 4429a; text by Gerhardt
| rowspan="2" | 
|- style="background: #E3F6CE;"
| chorale setting "Es ist gewisslich an der Zeit"
| after 4429a; text by Ringwaldt
|- style="background: #E3F6CE;"
| data-sort-value="0248.664" rowspan="2" | 248/64
| chorale setting "Ihr Christen auserkoren" (s. 4)
| rowspan="2" | D maj.
| rowspan="2" | SATB
| data-sort-value="000.05 1: 256" rowspan="2" | 51: 256
| rowspan="2" data-sort-value="III/02 1: 122" | III/2.1: 85
| after 5385a; text by Werner
| rowspan="2" | 
|- style="background: #E3F6CE;"
| chorale setting "Ach Herr, mich armen Sünder"
| after 5385a; text by Schneegaß
|- id="BWV 248VIa" style="background: #E3F6CE;"
| data-sort-value="0248.a60" | 248VIa
| data-sort-value="279.002" | 4.
| data-sort-value="1734-07-01" | 1734 or earlier
| Cantata model for BWV 248VI
| D maj.
| data-sort-value="satbSATB Trx3 Tmp Obx2 Obax2 Str Bc" | satbSATB 3Tr Tmp 2Ob 2Oba Str Bc  
| 
| data-sort-value="II/06: 700" | II/6
| data-sort-value="after BWV Anh. 010/1" | after BWV Anh. 10/1; → 248/54, /56–/57, /61–/64
| 
|- id="Easter Oratorio" style="background: #E3F6CE;"
| data-sort-value="0249.500" | 249.5
| data-sort-value="279.003" | 4.
| data-sort-value="1745-07-01" | 1743–17461749-04-061750-03-26
| Oratorio Kommt, eilet und laufet (Easter Oratorio; Easter)
| 
| data-sort-value="satbSATB Trx3 Tmp Fl Flx2 Obx2 Oba Str Bc" | satbSATB 3Tr Tmp Fl 2Fl 2Ob Oba Str Bc
| data-sort-value="000.21 3: 000" | 213
| data-sort-value="II/07: 001" | II/7: 1
| data-sort-value="after BWV 0249.4; text by Picander?" | after BWV 249.4; text by Picander?
| 
|- style="background: #E3F6CE;"
| data-sort-value="0249.400" | 249.4
| data-sort-value="279.004" | 4.
| data-sort-value="1738-07-01" | 
| Oratorio Kommt, eilet und laufet (Easter Oratorio, middle version; Easter)
| 
| data-sort-value="satbSATB Trx3 Tmp Fl Flx2 Obx2 Oba Str Bc" | satbSATB 3Tr Tmp Fl 2Fl 2Ob Oba Str Bc
| 
| data-sort-value="II/07: 000" | II/7
| data-sort-value="after BWV 0249.3; text by Picander?" | after BWV 249.3; text by Picander?; → BWV 249.5
| 
|- style="background: #E3F6CE;"
| data-sort-value="0249.300" | 249.3
| data-sort-value="281.001" | 4.
| data-sort-value="1725-04-01" | 1725-04-011738
| Cantata Kommt, fliehet und eilet (Easter Oratorio, early versions: first version as cantata; Easter)
| 
| data-sort-value="satbSATB Trx3 Tmp Fl Flx2 Obx2 Oba Vl Str Bc" | satbSATB 3Tr Tmp Fl 2Fl 2Ob Oba Vl Str Bc
| 
| data-sort-value="II/07: 097" | II/7: 97
| data-sort-value="after BWV 0249.1; text by Picander?" | after BWV 249.1; text by Picander?; → BWV 249.4
| 
|-  style="background: #E3F6CE;"
| data-sort-value="0249.100" | 249.1
| data-sort-value="281.002" | 4.
| 1725-02-23
| Secular cantata Entfliehet, verschwindet, entweichet, ihr Sorgen, a.k.a. Shepherd Cantata (birthday of Christian of Saxe-Weissenfels; music lost but in part reconstructable)
| 
| data-sort-value="satbSATB Trx3 Tmp Fl Flx2 Obx2 Str Bc" | satbSATB 3Tr Tmp Fl 2Fl 2Ob Str Bc
| 
| I/35
| text by Picander; → BWV 249.3/1–/3, /5, /7, /9, /11; 249.2
| 
|-
| data-sort-value="0249.200" | 249.2
| data-sort-value="282.001" | 4.
| 1726-08-25
| Secular cantata Verjaget, zerstreuet, zerrüttet, ihr Sterne a.k.a.
| 
| 
| 
| I/39
| data-sort-value="after BWV 0249.1/1–/3, /5, /7, /9, /11" | after BWV 249.1/1–/3, /5, /7, /9, /11; text by Picander
| 
|- style="background: #E3F6CE;"
| data-sort-value="0011.000" | 11
| data-sort-value="282.002" rowspan="2" | 4.
| rowspan="2" | 1735-05-19
| Oratorio Lobet Gott in seinen Reichen (Ascension Oratorio; Ascension)
| rowspan="2" | D maj.
| data-sort-value="satbSATB Trx3 Tmp Flx2 Obx2 Str Bc" | satbSATB 3Tr Tmp 2Fl 2Ob Str Bc
| data-sort-value="000.02: 001" | 2: 1
| data-sort-value="II/08: 001" | II/8: 1
| after Z 5741b (/6), 5264b (/9); text by Picander?, Rist (/6), Sacer (/9), after Lk 24:50ff., Acts 1:9–12, Mk 16:19
| 
|- style="background: #E3F6CE;"
| data-sort-value="0011.006" | 11/6
| chorale setting "Nun lieget alles unter dir" (= "Du Lebensfürst, Herr Jesu Christ", s. 4)
| SATB
| data-sort-value="000.02: 032" | 2: 32
| data-sort-value="III/02 2: 198" | III/2.2: 198
| after Z 5741b; text by Rist
| 
|}

References

Masses, Passions and Oratorios by Johann Sebastian Bach, List of